The following are the national records in athletics in Tanzania maintained by Tanzania's national athletics federation: Athletics Tanzania (AT).

Outdoor

Key to tables:

+ = en route to a longer distance

h = hand timing

A = affected by altitude

a = aided road course

NWI = no wind information

Men

Women

Indoor

Men

Women

References

External links
AT official web site

Tanzania
Athletics in Tanzania
Athletics